The 2019 French Open described below in detail, in form of day-by-day summaries.

All dates are in CEST.

Day 1 (26 May)
Schedule of play
Seeds out:
Men's singles:  Marco Cecchinato [16]
Women's singles:  Angelique Kerber [5]

Day 2 (27 May)
Schedule of play
Seeds out:
Men's singles:  Daniil Medvedev [12],  Nikoloz Basilashvili [15],  Denis Shapovalov [20],  Frances Tiafoe [32]
Women's singles:  Caroline Wozniacki [13],  Julia Görges [18],  Mihaela Buzărnescu [30],  Aliaksandra Sasnovich [32]

Day 3 (28 May)
Schedule of play
Seeds out:
Women's singles:  Anett Kontaveit [17]
Men's doubles:  Jamie Murray /  Bruno Soares [2],  Raven Klaasen /  Michael Venus [6],  Máximo González /  Horacio Zeballos [9],  Ivan Dodig /  Édouard Roger-Vasselin [12],  Ben McLachlan /  Jan-Lennard Struff [15],  Austin Krajicek /  Artem Sitak [16]

Day 4 (29 May)
Schedule of play
Seeds out:
Men's singles:  Marin Čilić [11],  Guido Pella [19],  Alex de Minaur [21],  Matteo Berrettini [29]
Women's singles:  Kiki Bertens [4]
Men's doubles:  Nikola Mektić /  Franko Škugor [5]
Women's doubles:  Eri Hozumi /  Makoto Ninomiya [12],  Irina-Camelia Begu /  Mihaela Buzărnescu [14]

Day 5 (30 May)
Schedule of play
Seeds out:
Men's singles:  Diego Schwartzman [17],  Fernando Verdasco [23],  Gilles Simon [26],  Kyle Edmund [28]
Women's singles:  Aryna Sabalenka [11],  Wang Qiang [16],  Daria Kasatkina [21],  Bianca Andreescu [22],  Caroline Garcia [24],  Hsieh Su-wei [25],  Maria Sakkari [29]
Women's doubles:  Barbora Krejčíková /  Kateřina Siniaková [1],  Darija Jurak /  Raluca Olaru [16]
Mixed Doubles:  Demi Schuurs /  Jean-Julien Rojer [4]

Day 6 (31 May)
Schedule of play
Seeds out:
Men's singles:  Lucas Pouille [22],  David Goffin [27],  Laslo Đere [31]
Women's singles:  Karolína Plíšková [2],  Elina Svitolina [9],  Belinda Bencic [15],  Elise Mertens [20],  Carla Suárez Navarro [28]
Women's doubles:  Chan Hao-ching /  Latisha Chan [8],  Anna-Lena Grönefeld /  Demi Schuurs [9]

Day 7 (1 June)
Schedule of play
Seeds out:
Men's singles:  Borna Ćorić [13],  Roberto Bautista Agut [18],  Dušan Lajović [30]
Women's singles:  Naomi Osaka [1],  Serena Williams [10],  Lesia Tsurenko [27]
Men's doubles:  Łukasz Kubot /  Marcelo Melo [1],  Bob Bryan /  Mike Bryan [7],  Nicolas Mahut /  Jürgen Melzer [13]
Women's doubles:  Alicja Rosolska /  Yang Zhaoxuan [13]

Day 8 (2 June)
Schedule of play
Seeds out:
Men's singles:  Stefanos Tsitsipas [6]
Women's singles:  Anastasija Sevastova [12],  Garbiñe Muguruza [19],  Donna Vekić [23]
Men's doubles:  Oliver Marach /  Mate Pavić [4],  Henri Kontinen /  John Peers [8],  Robin Haase /  Frederik Nielsen [14]
Women's doubles:  Hsieh Su-wei /  Barbora Strýcová [3]
Mixed doubles:  Anna-Lena Grönefeld /  Robert Farah [8]

Day 9 (3 June)
Schedule of play
Seeds out:
Men's singles:  Juan Martín del Potro [8],  Fabio Fognini [9],  Gaël Monfils [14]
Men's doubles:  Jean-Julien Rojer /  Horia Tecău [10]
Women's doubles:  Lucie Hradecká /  Andreja Klepač [10],  Victoria Azarenka /  Ashleigh Barty [11]
Mixed Doubles:  Chan Hao-ching /  Oliver Marach [6],  Alicja Rosolska /  Nikola Mektić [7]

Day 10 (4 June)
Schedule of play
Seeds out:
Men's singles:  Kei Nishikori [7],  Stan Wawrinka [24] 
Women's singles:  Sloane Stephens [7],  Petra Martić [31]
Men's doubles:  Rajeev Ram /  Joe Salisbury [11]
Women's doubles:  Gabriela Dabrowski /  Xu Yifan [4],  Samantha Stosur /  Zhang Shuai [5],  Nicole Melichar /  Květa Peschke [7]
Mixed Doubles:  Zhang Shuai /  John Peers [5]

Day 11 (5 June)
For the first time since 2016, all of the scheduled matches were disrupted by weather conditions and play was cancelled.
Schedule of play

Day 12 (6 June)
Play would normally start at 1500 CEST, but due to inclement weather on the previous day, matches started at 1200 CEST. The women's semifinal match that was scheduled to be played was moved to Friday, 7 June.
Schedule of play
Seeds out:
Men's singles:  Alexander Zverev [5],  Karen Khachanov [10]
Women's singles:  Simona Halep [3],  Madison Keys [14]
Men's doubles:  Juan Sebastián Cabal /  Robert Farah [3]
Mixed Doubles:  Nicole Melichar /  Bruno Soares [1]

Day 13 (7 June)
Schedule of play
Seeds out:
Men's singles:  Roger Federer [3]
Women's singles:  Johanna Konta [26] 
Women's doubles:  Elise Mertens /  Aryna Sabalenka [6],  Kirsten Flipkens /  Johanna Larsson [15]
Mixed doubles:  Gabriela Dabrowski /  Mate Pavić [2]

Day 14 (8 June)
Schedule of play
Seeds out:
Men's singles:  Novak Djokovic [1]

Day 15 (9 June)
Rafael Nadal won his 12th French Open, an extended record breaking 12th title in a single Grand Slam tournament, surpassed Margaret Court's overall titles in a single Major. By capturing his 18th Grand Slam title, Nadal closed the gap on Roger Federer's record of 20 Grand Slam titles, and it is the first time that the gap of slams between the two has been down to just 2 since Federer overhauled Pete Sampras' then record of 14 Grand Slam titles in 2009. 
Schedule of play
Seeds out:
Men's singles:  Dominic Thiem [4]

References

Day-by-day summaries
French Open by year – Day-by-day summaries